Ranquil River is a stream of the Biobío Region of Chile.

References

Rivers of Chile
Rivers of Biobío Region